Mirabdulla Abbasov (born 27 April 1995) is an Azerbaijani footballer who plays as a forward for Neftchi Baku and Azerbaijan national football team. He was selected as the footballer of the year in Azerbaijan in 2018.

Career
Mirabdulla Abbasov was born in 1995 in Baku, Azerbaijan. His older brother Mirsahib Abbasov is a football player as well. Mirabdulla played in the academy of Neftchi Baku and made his professional debut on 5 May 2015 in a game against Baku. In 2016, he was loaned out to the Latvian Higher League team Daugavpils and Azerbaijani Premier League team Sumgayit.

He became a regular player in the main team of Neftchi during the 2017–2018 season and earned 25 caps. At the end of the season, he extended his contract with Neftchi for another year until the end of 2018–2019 season. 

On 25 June 2019, Abbasov had joined Sabail on a season-long loan deal.

International
He made his debut for Azerbaijan national football team on 17 November 2018 in a 2018–19 UEFA Nations League D game against Faroe Islands.

Career statistics

Club

Honours

International
Azerbaijan U23
 Islamic Solidarity Games: (1) 2017

Individual
Azerbaijani Footballer of the Year (1): 2018

References

External links 

1995 births
Living people
Azerbaijani footballers
Azerbaijan international footballers
Azerbaijani expatriate footballers
Azerbaijan Premier League players
Expatriate footballers in Latvia
Footballers from Baku
Neftçi PFK players
BFC Daugavpils players
Sumgayit FK players
Sabail FK players
Association football forwards
Azerbaijani expatriate sportspeople in Latvia